Achalgarh is a fort situated about  north of Mount Abu, a hill station in Rajasthan, India.  The fort was originally built by the Paramara dynasty rulers and later reconstructed, renovated and named as Achalgarh by Maharana Kumbha in 1452 CE, one of the 32 forts built during his reign.

The fort is in a dilapidated condition now. The first gate of the fort is known as Hanumanpol, which served as the entrance to the lower fort. It comprises two towers built of large blocks of grey granite. After some ascent, stands Champapol, the second gate of the fort, which served as the entrance to the inner fort.

There are some features of historical and religious importance in and around the fort. Achaleshwar Mahadev Temple is just outside the fort; the toe of Shiva is worshipped there and a brass Nandi is also located there. Near the temple there are three stone buffaloes standing around a pond. There are Jain temples in the fort. These were built in 1513.

References

External links
 Dilwara Temples and Nakki Lake in Mount Abu

Buildings and structures completed in 1462
Mount Abu
Forts in Rajasthan
1452 in Asia
15th century in India
Tourism in Mount Abu